Lower Montague was a municipality that held community status in Prince Edward Island, Canada. It was located to the east of Montague.

The Community of Lower Montague was incorporated in 1974. The first inhabitants of the Island and the area later called Lower Montague were the First Nations Mi’kmag people who came to the Island seasonally and established summer camps. They called the island Abegweit or "resting on the wave". They mostly harvested the richness of forest, field and sea. An Indian burial site reportedly exists along the waters edge and the intersection with the Thornton Road.

Lower Montague formed the major part of Lot 59 which has a population of 1285 (2006 Census).

On September 28, 2018, it was merged with six other municipalities to create the town of Three Rivers.

References

External links 
 https://web.archive.org/web/20120131184900/http://www.lowermontague.ca/site/

Communities in Kings County, Prince Edward Island
Former rural municipalities in Prince Edward Island
Neighbourhoods in Montague, Prince Edward Island
Populated places disestablished in 2018